Prospect is an unincorporated community in Giles County, Tennessee. The zip code is 38477.

The southern agricultural pioneer and publisher Cully Cobb was born in Prospect in 1884.

References

Unincorporated communities in Giles County, Tennessee
Unincorporated communities in Tennessee